Serixia cavifrons is a species of beetle in the family Cerambycidae. It was described by Per Olof Christopher Aurivillius in 1927.

References

Serixia
Beetles described in 1927